KPLP (104.5 FM) is a non-commercial radio station in White Salmon, Washington. It is owned by Walla Walla University, and it airs a Contemporary Christian radio format. The signal rimshots the Portland Metro and covers the Southwestern and the mid-Southern part of Washington as well having a city grade signal in The Dalles.

On April 5, 2021, Bustos Media began operating the station under a local marketing agreement and flipped the station from soft oldies to Spanish-language rhythmic top 40, simulcasting KOOR 1010 AM Milwaukie, Oregon.

Effective June 2, 2022, Jackman Holding Company, LLC sold the then-KXXP to Walla Walla University, officially ending Bustos Media's LMA. With it, Bustos Media moved the Spanish Rhythmic Top 40 format back to KOOR. The station changed its call sign to KPLP on July 7, 2022 and the station also flipped to Contemporary Christian (English). The station was also converted to non-commercial status.

References

External links

PLP 
Radio stations established in 2019
2019 establishments in Oregon
Walla Walla University